Hensley W. Sapenter (born December 16, 1939) is a former American football coach and athletics administrator. He served as the head football coach at Prairie View A&M University from 1995 to 1996, compiling a record of 0–22. Sapenter was inducted into the Texas Black Sports Hall of Fame in 2003.

Early life and playing career
Sapenter grew up in San Antonio and attended Wheatley High School there. He played college football at Prairie View A&M University as a center and linebacker for in the late 1950s under head coach Billy Nicks.  He was inducted into the school's Sports Hall of Fame in 1995.

Coaching career
After graduating from Prairie View in 1960, Sapenter began his coaching career at Booker T. Washington High School in Wichita Falls, Texas, working as an assistant football coach under Ervin Garnet.

Sapenter was hired as the athletic director for the San Antonio Independent School District in 1976. He had recently retired from that post when, in 1995, he was hired as interim head football coach and athletic director at Prairie View, despite having not coached at any level since 1972. He was told that he would only be considered for the full-time job if he could win.

In two years, Sapenter finished 0–22, making him one of the few college football coaches to have never won a game.  During his tenure, his teams were outscored 950–210.

On September 23, Prairie View was drubbed, 44–6 by  tying Macalester's NCAA record 50 straight losses. They broke the tie the next week with a 64–0 thumping by —the 399th career win for Grambling's legendary coach, Eddie Robinson.

The streak grew to 80 consecutive losses before it was broken in 1998.  Sapenter was first suspended with pay and then subsequently fired following an investigation into the use of ineligible players.

Head coaching record

See also
 List of college football coaches with 0 wins

References

1939 births
Living people
American football centers
American football linebackers
Prairie View A&M Panthers and Lady Panthers athletic directors
Prairie View A&M Panthers football coaches
Prairie View A&M Panthers football players
High school football coaches in Texas
High school track and field coaches in the United States
Coaches of American football from Texas
Players of American football from San Antonio
African-American coaches of American football
African-American players of American football
African-American college athletic directors in the United States
20th-century African-American sportspeople
21st-century African-American sportspeople